Argyroeides ophion is a moth of the subfamily Arctiinae. It was described by Francis Walker in 1854. It is found in Venezuela and Santa Catarina, Brazil.

References

Moths described in 1854
Argyroeides
Moths of South America